Amorphoscelis reticulata is a species of praying mantis that is native to Sarawak.

See also
List of mantis genera and species

References

Amorphoscelis
Mantodea of Asia
Insects described in 1933